Shankar Rao (born 6 December 1982) is an Indian first-class cricketer who plays for Jharkhand.

References

External links
 

1982 births
Living people
Indian cricketers
Bihar cricketers
Jharkhand cricketers
People from Dhanbad
Cricketers from Jharkhand